Sub-micro AC drives belong to the class of electrical components primarily intended to convert voltage and current levels received from wall outlets to be compatible with motors built in another region (such as allowing motors built in France to run in the United States without major modification).

Electric motors